John Chaldos was a Byzantine general under Basil II.

Life 
As his surname indicates, Chaldos was native of Chaldia, region in northeastern Asia Minor. He may have been of Armenian origin. 

Alternatively, he may have held all three offices concurrently, despite their wide geographic separation. He was certainly at his post as governor of Thessalonica in September 995, for he issued an act (sigillion) confirming various privileges and exemptions of the Kolobou Monastery at Ierissos on Chalcidice, which survives to this day.

Soon after, in early 996, he was captured by the Bulgarians in another ambush placed by Tsar Samuel of Bulgaria. He remained in Bulgarian captivity for 22 years, until the final collapse of Bulgarian resistance in 1018, when he was released upon the surrender of Dragomouzos, the Bulgarian governor of Strumitza, to Emperor Basil II. Following the death of Taronites and the capture of Chaldos, Basil II appointed one of his most trusted subordinates, Nikephoros Ouranos, as commander-in-chief in the Balkans, resulting in the crushing victory over Samuel and his army at the Battle of Spercheios.

John Chaldos is mentioned next, and for the last time, during the 1030 campaign by Emperor Romanos III Argyros against the Mirdasids of Aleppo, which he advised against. The Emperor did not heed his opinion, and the campaign ended in a humiliating defeat in the Battle of Azaz.

References

Sources
 
 
 
 
 

10th-century Byzantine people
Byzantine generals
Byzantine governors of Thessalonica
Byzantine people of the Byzantine–Bulgarian Wars
Byzantine people of Armenian descent
Byzantine Pontians
Byzantine prisoners of war
Governors of the Armeniac Theme
Governors of the Bucellarian Theme
Generals of Basil II
Patricii
Prisoners and detainees of the First Bulgarian Empire